The  Chicago Bears season was the franchise's 94th season in the National Football League. The season was the first year under head coach Marc Trestman after Lovie Smith was fired on December 31, 2012. The team played at Soldier Field for the 11th season since its reconstruction in 2001. The Bears failed to qualify for the playoffs with an 8–8 record, the sixth time in seven years since the Super Bowl XLI loss in 2006.

The Bears started the regular season by winning their first three games before losing in weeks four and five to the Detroit Lions and New Orleans Saints, respectively. The following game after winning against the New York Giants, quarterback Jay Cutler suffered a groin injury against the Washington Redskins, as the Bears entered the bye week at 4–3. With Cutler out, Josh McCown stepped in against the Green Bay Packers in week nine, leading the Bears to victory. Cutler returned in the next game against the Lions, but injured his ankle in the loss, and McCown filled in for the next four games; during the four-game span under McCown, the Bears went 2–2, while McCown excelled, throwing thirteen touchdowns and one interception. When Cutler returned in week fifteen against the Cleveland Browns, controversy arose over who should be the starter.

After winning against Cleveland, the Lions lost the following day, allowing the Bears the opportunity to clinch the NFC North in week sixteen with Packers and Lions losses grouped with a victory over the Philadelphia Eagles. However, the Bears lost 54–11 against the Eagles, and in week seventeen against the Packers, the Bears were eliminated from playoff contention with a 33–28 loss.

Offseason

Organizational changes

On December 31, 2012, nine-year head coach Lovie Smith was fired. After Smith's firing, the Bears requested interviews with thirteen coaches, twelve from the NFL and Montreal Alouettes (of the Canadian Football League) head coach Marc Trestman. The hunt later narrowed down to Trestman, Seattle Seahawks offensive coordinator Darrell Bevell and Indianapolis Colts offensive coordinator Bruce Arians. Ultimately, Trestman was hired on January 15.

After Trestman's hiring, he hired New Orleans Saints' offensive line coach Aaron Kromer as offensive coordinator, and the Dallas Cowboys later reported that Joe DeCamillis, who had been among the Bears' 13 head coaching candidates, would join the Bears as the team's assistant head coach/special teams coordinator. Trestman also hired Andy Bischoff and Michael Sinclair as tight ends and defensive line coaches, respectively; both coaches had worked with Trestman in Montreal. Alouettes offensive coordinator Pat Meyer also joined the Bears as offensive line coach, along with Purdue defensive coordinator and colleague of Trestman, Tim Tibesar, as linebackers coach. Former Alouettes coaches Brendan Nugent and Carson Walch were hired as offensive quality control assistants.

On January 15, special teams coordinator Dave Toub announced that he is leaving the Bears for the Kansas City Chiefs. Two days later, it was announced that defensive coordinator Rod Marinelli would not return to the team. Eight assistants were also dismissed: quarterbacks coach Jeremy Bates, running backs coach Tim Spencer, wide receivers coach Darryl Drake, tight ends coach Mike DeBord, offensive line coach Tim Holt, linebackers coach Bob Babich, defensive backs coach Gill Byrd, and offensive coordinator Mike Tice. To replace Bates and Spencer, Chicago hired Matt Cavanaugh and Skip Peete as quarterbacks and running backs coach, respectively. To take Marinelli's place, the Bears hired Jacksonville Jaguars' defensive coordinator Mel Tucker. On February 21, Trestman's staff was completed after the Bears hired Alabama coach Mike Groh as wide receivers coach.

On January 19, Bears director of physical development Rusty Jones announced his retirement after 28 years in the NFL. He was eventually replaced by Mike Clark. On January 28, Chicago hired former Bears safety Chris Harris as defensive quality control, with Sean Desai serving the same position, along with Dwayne Stukes as assistant special teams coordinator.

On May 3, Bears pro scouting director Chris Ballard, who had been hired by general manager Phil Emery, left the team for the Chiefs, and was replaced by assistant director of college scouting Kevin Turks. Regional scout James Kirkland was also let go. On May 6, executive director and Southeastern Conference overseer Ted Monago joined the St. Louis Rams. On the same day, Kevin Turks and Dwayne Joseph were promoted to director of pro personnel and assistant director of pro personnel, respectively; Chiefs area scout Ryan Kessenich was also hired as a scout. Chicago also hired Jay Muraco as scout of the East Coast and Andre Odom as a scouting assistant. The Bears also promoted Breck Ackley to South Central area scout and Sam Summerville to scout the Southeast area and David Williams to player personnel and scout. On May 16, the Bears promoted Southeast area scout Mark Sadowski to senior national scout.

Roster changes

The Bears entered free agency with 16 unrestricted free agents.

Acquisitions
The first addition of 2013 by the Bears was defensive end Cheta Ozougwu on January 2, followed by Brittan Golden two days later. On January 7, quarterback Matt Blanchard and receiver Terrence Toliver were signed; the next three days involved the signings of Patrick Trahan, Brody Eldridge, Fendi Onobun and Lawrence Wilson, respectively. On January 28 and 29, Cyhl Quarles and Tom Nelson were signed, respectively. The lone acquisition of February occurred on February 11 with cornerback LeQuan Lewis.

NFL free agency opened on March 12, with the Bears signing New York Giants tight end Martellus Bennett and New Orleans Saints offensive lineman Jermon Bushrod on that day. From March 20 to 24, the Bears signed at least one player per day, starting with Turk McBride. Steve Maneri (March 21), D. J. Williams (March 22), Tom Zbikowski (March 23), and James Anderson (March 24). Offensive lineman Matt Slauson was signed on March 29. On April 9, Andre Fluellen, Kyle Moore and Taylor Boggs were signed. Offensive lineman Eben Britton was signed on April 16, followed by kicker Austin Signor three days later. The only signing in May was undrafted rookie Maurice Jones on May 12. On June 10, the Bears signed Devin Aromashodu, Jerrell Jackson and Tony Fiammetta, followed by Sedrick Ellis the next day.

Departures
The first departure of the team was receiver Johnny Knox on February 12, who had suffered a serious injury in 2011 and missed the entire 2012 season. On March 13, tight ends Kellen Davis and Matt Spaeth were waived. The single departure of April occurred on April 2, with the release of defensive lineman Matt Toeaina. On June 9, offensive lineman and the team's first-round draft pick in 2011 Gabe Carimi was traded to the Tampa Bay Buccaneers for a sixth-rounder in the 2014 draft. The following day, Evan Rodriguez, Dale Moss and Demetrius Fields were waived.

Eleven of the Bears' UFAs did not return, nine of whom joining other teams, starting with linebacker Geno Hayes' signing with the Jacksonville Jaguars on March 13. The Bears lost another linebacker in Nick Roach on March 15, when he joined the Oakland Raiders, and another defensive player was lost when cornerback D. J. Moore was signed by the Carolina Panthers four days later. On March 20, eight-time Pro Bowler and 13-year linebacker Brian Urlacher was not retained for the 2013 season. Six days later, Jason Campbell was signed by the Cleveland Browns, and the next day, Lance Louis joined the Miami Dolphins.

2013 draft class

The Bears entered the draft with needs at positions including offensive lineman, linebacker, defensive lineman and cornerback. In the first round, with the twentieth pick, the Bears selected Oregon offensive tackle Kyle Long. Long, the son of Pro Football Hall of Famer Howie Long and younger brother of St. Louis Rams' defensive end Chris Long, played in only 21 games while starting 15 with Oregon. In the second round, with the fiftieth pick, the Bears selected Jon Bostic, a linebacker from Florida, who recorded 68 tackles with the nation's fifth-ranked defense in 2012. Two rounds later, the Bears used their 117th overall pick on Rutgers linebacker Khaseem Greene, who holds the NCAA record for career forced fumbles with 15. In the fifth round, the Bears traded down ten spots with the Atlanta Falcons to draft Louisiana Tech offensive tackle Jordan Mills, marking the first time the team selected two offensive linemen in the same draft since 2002. In the sixth round, Chicago selected Georgia Bulldogs defensive end Cornelius Washington, who led linebackers in the bench press at the NFL Combine with 36 repetitions at 225 pounds. Using a seventh-rounder acquired in the trade with Atlanta, the Bears drafted wide receiver Marquess Wilson, who left the Washington State football team, citing abuse from head coach Mike Leach despite setting team records with 82 receptions for 1,388 yards and 12 touchdowns in 2011, followed by 52 receptions for 813 yards and five touchdowns in 2012.

The Bears draft class received average grades, with questions from some graders questioning the selections of Long and Bostic, including Jason Cole of Yahoo! Sports, who gave the class a grade of "C+". Yahoo! Sports writer Billy Grayson  ESPN draft analyst Mel Kiper, Jr. stated that he "wasn't in love with the value" of Long's talent, classifying the draft class as a "C+", while Sports Illustrated writer Chris Burke asked why Chicago selected Bostic over Kansas State linebacker Arthur Brown. However, Burke praised Washington's selection as a potential steal, giving a grade of "B−". Thad Novak of the International Business Times gave Long the lowest grade of the players drafted by Chicago with a "C−", considering him a "raw" player; Mills was awarded a "C+", due to not blocking against many top defenders in college. Washington and Wilson were given a "B−" and "B+", respectively, the former despite being a linebacker, could adjust into the Bears' 4-3 defense. Linebackers Bostic and Greene were given an "A" and "A+", the latter being considered a steal that could add depth to the linebacking corps. Vinny Iyer of Sporting News gave the class a "C", stated Long should start as a guard before switching to tackle, which would be filled by Mills; Iyer also considered Bostic a "textbook replacement" for Brian Urlacher, while Greene can replace Nick Roach as a strong-side linebacker. After the 2013 season, Kiper improved the Bears' class to a "B".

All six players drafted agreed to four-year contracts. Mills and Washington were the first players to sign on May 1, followed by Greene and Wilson the following day. Bostic was the next player to sign, agreeing to a contract on May 9, and Long was the final player to sign, signing his contract on May 17.

Notes
 The team traded its third-round selection along with a 2012 third-round selection to the Miami Dolphins in exchange for wide receiver Brandon Marshall.
 The team traded its seventh-round selection to the Tampa Bay Buccaneers in exchange for defensive tackle Brian Price.

Undrafted free agents
After the draft's conclusion, the Bears announced that they had come to terms with ten undrafted free agents: LSU running back and center Michael Ford and P. J. Lonergan, respectively, Rutgers receiver Mark Harrison, Oklahoma cornerback and punter Demontre Hurst and Tress Way, respectively, Iowa State receiver Josh Lenz, Montana State linebacker Zach Minter, Memphis receiver Marcus Rucker, Georgia Southern defensive tackle Brent Russell, and NC State cornerback C. J. Wilson.

Offseason activities
On April 2, the Bears began a voluntary offseason program, and because they had a new head coach, the Bears were given a two-week earlier start than teams that did not hire a new head coach. For the first two weeks of the program, the only activities allowed were strength and conditioning and rehabilitation, and only strength and conditioning coaches are allowed to be on the field with the players. On the third week, a voluntary minicamp was held, and all coaches were permitted to work. From April 16–18, the Bears held two-hour non-contact drills, and held ten organized team activities (OTAs) during May 13 – June 6, followed by a mandatory minicamp from June 11–13.

The Bears started the first of ten OTAs on May 13. Rookie Kyle Long did not attend due to the University of Oregon having final examinations running through June 14. Gabe Carimi was the lone eligible player to not attend the workouts on the first day, as he stated that he was training in Arizona. Despite being expected to attend the team's mandatory minicamp, on June 9, Carimi was traded to the Buccaneers for an unconditional sixth-round draft pick in the 2014 draft. Long returned to workouts on June 17.

On the first day of the mandatory minicamp, offensive coordinator Aaron Kromer did not attend the on-field segment due to hip surgery. A. J. Lindeman and Willie Carter tried out with the team during the day. Brandon Marshall and Alshon Jeffery skipped the next day's workout, due to a hip surgery and a hamstring injury suffered during the previous week's OTAs, respectively. Lindeman would be signed during the day, while Maurice Jones would be released.

Rookie minicamp
The Bears opened rookie minicamp at the Walter Payton Center on March 10, and concluded on May 12. A total of 59 players participated, which includes the six draft picks, nine of the ten undrafted free agents (Mark Harrison was going to be signed, but failed his physical as he was recovering from a broken fifth metatarsal), kicker Austin Signor, ten veteran players, and 33 tryout players. Following minicamp, on May 13, the Bears signed receiver Demetrius Fields, defensive tackles Corvey Irvin and Christian Tupou, and cornerback Maurice Jones, while releasing Dom DeCicco and LeQuan Lewis.

Training Camp
Training Camp took place from July 25 to August 14 at Olivet Nazarene University in Bourbonnais, Illinois for the twelfth consecutive year. The team used the newly built Student Life Recreation Center as a weight room, indoor walk-through and personnel meeting building. On August 12, the Bears and ONU agreed to extend the camp through 2022. Practice with full pads on was held on July 28.

On the first day of Training Camp, Sedrick Ellis did not report, and eventually announced his retirement. On June 29, newcomer Turk McBride suffered a ruptured Achilles tendon, and was out for the season; McBride would be released two days later. During the day, Jermon Bushrod suffered a mild calf sprain, and was replaced by Jonathan Scott during practices. On the same day, Cheta Ozougwu did not practice due to a hamstring strain. However, Scott eventually injured his calf, so Eben Britton and Cory Brandon took first team reps. Anderson (knee), D. J. Williams (calf) and Corey Wootton (hip) also were forced to miss practice.

The team hosted the annual Family Fest at Soldier Field on August 3 in front of a crowd of 29,000. At the event, Kelvin Hayden tore his left hamstring, and was ruled out for remainder of the season. Hayden would be placed on injured reserve on August 10.

The first acquisition of Training Camp occurred on the first day, with Jamaal Anderson being signed to replace Ellis. After McBride's release, Josh Williams was signed. On August 2, Austin Signor was released, and Andrew Starks was signed. The next day, the Bears signed Leonard Pope, and released Brody Eldridge.

Preseason

Transactions

Schedule
The Bears' preseason opponents and schedule was announced on April 4. Chicago would open the preseason on the road against the Carolina Panthers, followed by an ESPN-televised game against the San Diego Chargers. The Bears would then visit the Oakland Raiders, for whom head coach Marc Trestman, offensive coordinator/offensive line coach Aaron Kromer and running backs coach Skip Peete worked for during its run to Super Bowl XXXVII, before ending the preseason against frequent preseason opponent Cleveland Browns, the tenth consecutive meeting between the two teams.

Game summaries
Against the Panthers, the Bears' defense forced three turnovers in the first half, which included a 51-yard interception return for touchdown by Jon Bostic, followed by Zack Bowman intercepting Derek Anderson and Sherrick McManis forcing Kenjon Barner to fumble; the Bears recorded a total of four takeaways in the game. However, the offense allowed seven sacks and had three turnovers, one of which was a fumble by Armando Allen. Panthers cornerback Josh Norman had two interceptions, one of which set up the first score of the game via Cam Newton's three-yard touchdown pass to Brandon LaFell early in the game. Bostic's pick-six tied up the game, followed by Robbie Gould's 35-yard field goal in the second quarter. With 18 seconds left in the first half, Carolina scored again on Kenjon Barner's 5-yard touchdown run; the Panthers scored the lone points of the third quarter after Norman intercepted Matt Blanchard, scoring on the 60-yard return. Though the Bears retaliated after Blanchard threw a 58-yard pass to Marquess Wilson to Carolina's 4-yard line, followed by Michael Ford's touchdown run, Graham Gano's 50-yard field goal was the final score of the game, as the Panthers triumphed 24–17.

Playing San Diego, Chicago opened with touchdowns by Brandon Marshall and Matt Forte, and led 20–0 late in the second quarter. The defense forced four turnovers in the first half off Chris Conte's interception, Major Wright's fumble recovery, Blake Costanzo recovering a muffed punt, and Corvey Irvin's recovery of a blocked punt. The Chargers began to rally, scoring on Fozzy Whittaker's rushing touchdown in the second quarter, followed by two more touchdowns in the third quarter, which Chicago countered with Michael Ford's 100-yard kickoff return to San Diego's 4-yard line. Afterwards, Michael Bush ran for a 3-yard touchdown, and while San Diego managed to score two more touchdowns, but the Bears held on to win 33–28.

Against Oakland, the Bears scored 23 unanswered points in the first half, along with outgaining the Raiders 222 yards to 34 with a little over 10 minutes remaining in the first half. The Bears scored first off Forte's 32-yard touchdown, followed by Bush scoring two rushing touchdowns of ten and one yard each, and the first half ended with a 27–3 lead for Chicago. Meanwhile, the defense forced four turnovers off Tim Jennings and Isaiah Frey intercepting Matt Flynn and C. J. Wilson and Jerry Franklin intercepting Matt McGloin. As for Oakland, Terrelle Pryor replaced Flynn in the second half, and led the Raiders to two touchdowns and a field goal to narrow the gap to 27–20. The Bears retaliated with Michael Ford scoring a 15-yard touchdown, and the Raiders responded with McGloin's 5-yard touchdown pass to Jaime Olawale, but failed the two-point conversion, and the Bears sealed the game with Franklin's interception to win 34–26.

In Cleveland, the Bears started strong after Demontre Hurst intercepted Brian Hoyer's pass, which led to Robbie Gould's field goal, followed by Jordan Palmer's touchdown pass to Joseph Anderson, which Cleveland retaliated with James Michael-Johnson intercepting Trent Edwards and scoring. Late in the game, the Bears led 16–9, and Sherrick McManis intercepted Hoyer, who made up for the pick by throwing a touchdown pass to Dan Gronkowski. Later, Armonty Bryant forced Harvey Unga to fumble, which was recovered by Cleveland's L. J. Foyt, which led to Spencer Lanning kicking the go-ahead field goal to put the Browns up 18–16. With a little over a minute left in the game, Gould missed a 57-yarder wide left, giving Cleveland the win.

Regular season

Transactions

Schedule
The Bears' schedule was released on April 18, 2013. Aside from the six games against their NFC North rivals, the Bears had the AFC North and NFC East on the schedule, along with two intraconference games against opponents with the same division placing as the Bears in the previous season. As a result, the Bears were assigned the St. Louis Rams and New Orleans Saints. NFL.com ranked the Bears' schedule as the sixteenth-strongest in the league, with all opponents having a combined  record of 128–127–1, and a winning percentage total of .502.

Game summaries

Week 1: vs. Cincinnati Bengals

The Bears kicked off the regular season at home against the Cincinnati Bengals. The game was the teams' first meeting since 2009, in which the Bengals won 45–10. Since , the Bears dropped two of three games to the Bengals, winning 24–0 in 2001, while losing 24–7 in 2005 and 45–10 in 2009. The two teams entered with defenses that ranked in the top six in 2012, but the Bears were ranked 16th in scoring at 23.4 points per game and 28th overall on offense, while the Bengals had an average score of 24.4 PPG and were 22nd in total offense. Among the Bears' strategies that should be utilized include trying to protect Jay Cutler, as six of the Bengals' linemen had combined for 129 career sacks. The Bears' offensive line allowed 44 sacks in 2012, and as a result, changed the line by adding veterans Jermon Bushrod and Matt Slauson to supplement Roberto Garza on the left, while rookies Kyle Long and Jordan Mills joined Garza on the right side, marking the first time the Bears offensive line featured two rookies since Jim Covert and Rob Fada in 1983. The Bears' defense had to apply pressure to Andy Dalton, whose quick release led to four play-action touchdown passes to A. J. Green in 2013, the third most in the NFL. Bears' radio announcer Jeff Joniak wrote, "Marc Trestman owns the element of surprise, a true asset in Week 1. There is not much tape on Trestman for the Bengals to game plan from. It's old tape with very different personnel from a different time and place in the NFL. Trestman will try to use this asset to his advantage and a quick strike early in the game will jack up the crowd, and give the team a foundation to build on." The Bears captains team captains for the season, starting with the Bengals game, were Cutler and Roberto Garza on offense, Lance Briggs and Julius Peppers on defense and Patrick Mannelly on special teams. 2013 was Mannelly's sixth consecutive season as captain, the fifth season for Cutler, third for Garza, fourth for Peppers and first for Briggs.

Chicago struck first with Charles Tillman intercepting Dalton, which was followed with Cutler's eight-yard touchdown pass to Martellus Bennett, which the Bengals responded with a two-yard touchdown pass to Green. On the Bengals' first drive of the second quarter, Green was stripped by Tim Jennings, but the fumble went out of bounds. However, Dalton would be intercepted again by Tillman, his career-high second pick of the game, but the Bears failed to capitalize, and the Bengals scored again on Dalton's 45-yard touchdown pass to Greene. The Bears' Robbie Gould connected on a team record 58-yard field goal to close out the first half. In the second half, the Bengals scored again, after Tillman was penalized for pass interference, via BenJarvus Green-Ellis' 5-yard touchdown run, which the Bears retaliated with Matt Forté's one-yard touchdown run. In the fourth quarter, Cutler was intercepted by Vontaze Burfict, but the Bears got the ball back after Jennings forced Mohamed Sanu to fumble. On the next drive, the Bears converted a fourth down and Cutler threw the go ahead and eventual game-winning 19-yard touchdown pass to Brandon Marshall with 8:06 remaining. The Bengals failed to score on the next drive with 6:38 left, and the Bears clinched the game after Rey Maualuga was called for a personal foul after Michael Bush was stopped on third down. The Bears were able to run out the clock due to Cincinnati mis-using its time-outs.

With the win, Trestman became the fourth head coach in franchise history to win his head coaching debut, after George Halas, Neill Armstrong and Dick Jauron. The Bears comeback in the second half marked the first time since 1980 the Bears came back from an 11-point deficit to win with two touchdown drives of 80 yards or more. The offense allowed zero sacks, the first time the Bears didn't allow a sack in a season opener since 1998 against the Jacksonville Jaguars.

Week 2: vs. Minnesota Vikings

In week two, the Bears donned their 1940s alternate uniforms against rival Minnesota, in the second home game of the season, marking the first time since 1999 that the Bears hosted the first two games of the regular season. During the two games played between the rivals last season, the Bears won the first game 28–10, while the Vikings won the second 21–14. Since 2001, the Bears led the series 16–10. ESPN writes that the Bears could capitalize on the Vikings' tendency to turn the ball over, as they gave away the ball to the Detroit Lions four times in week one. Chicago's defense should also prevent NFL MVP Adrian Peterson, who had been struggling when playing the Bears at Soldier Field. Since 2009, Peterson has been able to record only 73 rushing yards per game.

The Bears fell behind early after Cordarrelle Patterson's 105-yard kickoff return for a touchdown. Devin Hester attempted to respond on the ensuing kickoff, but was pushed out of bounds at the Vikings' 32-yard line. The Bears fought back with a one-yard touchdown pass by Jay Cutler to Martellus Bennett, which Chicago added to with Cutler's touchdown pass to Brandon Marshall. In the second quarter, Jared Allen stripped the ball from Cutler, and Brian Robison returned the fumble 61 yards for a touchdown with 7:34 to go in the half. Afterwards, Hester returned the kickoff 80 yards to Minnesota's 23-yard line. The Bears offense later reached Minnesota's one-yard line, but Cutler had his pass intercepted by Kevin Williams in the end zone for a touchback. The Vikings failed to capitalize on the turnover after Tim Jennings intercepted Christian Ponder and scored on a 44-yard interception return. Minnesota retaliated with Ponder's 20-yard touchdown pass to Kyle Rudolph with 1:11 remaining, and the half ended with the Bears settling for a field goal. In the second half, the Vikings scored two field goals from Blair Walsh to take the 30–24 lead. However, the Bears scored on Cutler's 16-yard touchdown pass to Bennett, and ultimately prevailed after recovering a fumbled squib kick.

The win marked the second time in franchise history that the Bears won their first two games after trailing in the fourth quarter, the first being in 1971. During halftime, the team honored the 1963 Bears, two days following the death of running back Rick Casares, who was the team's leading rusher until Walter Payton surpassed him. When asked about Casares, defensive end Ed O'Bradovich stated, "Oh my God, I think when you talk to my fellow teammates over here, what was all right, true and good about professional football was embodied in Rick Casares. Nobody loved the game more than him."

Week 3: at Pittsburgh Steelers

The Bears travelled to Heinz Field to face the winless Pittsburgh Steelers in their first NBC Sunday Night Football matchup of the season. Pittsburgh had lost the previous week to Cincinnati to fall to 0–2 for the first time in 11 years. In the last game between the two in 2009, the Bears triumphed 17–14. The Bears were the 1-point favorites; eight CBSSports.com experts voted on their predictions for the game, with a 5–3 result favoring Chicago, while four ESPN analysts predicted that the Steelers would win. One of the goals of the defense was to contain Ben Roethlisberger in the passing pocket, especially as the offensive line suffered the loss of center Maurkice Pouncey. Additionally, the Steelers also had the 31st-ranked rushing offense and had yet to score a rushing touchdown, who was expected to regain first-rounder Le'Veon Bell. Alan Rubenstein of ChicagoNow writes that the Bears should attempt to improve their pass rush, which was only able to record two sacks in the last two games. Marc Trestman cited the weather as a factor for the poor performance, stating, "It's tough to rush the passer in wet weather... For both sides. It's tough to get a pass rush with a soggy field and a wet field. It's an advantage throwing the football. On a rainy day (versus) no rain, really the advantage goes to the offense. Because we can sit back there and protect. And it's really hard to configure a pass rush to get close." On offense, the Bears should attempt to attack the Steelers' 14th-ranked rush defense. A key matchup was the WR-CB duel between Brandon Marshall and Ike Taylor; Taylor contained Bengals receiver A. J. Green, who recorded 162 yards against the Bears in week one, to just six catches for 41 yards in week two.

Chicago started the game with Robbie Gould's field goal, followed by Matt Forté and Michael Bush's touchdown runs to take a 17–0 lead in the first quarter. Pittsburgh then scored on Shaun Suisham's 27-yard field goal, but the Bears then scored after Major Wright returned Roethlisberger's interception 38 yards for a touchdown for the 24–3 lead at halftime. In the second half, the Steelers began to rally with Roethlisberger throwing two touchdown passes of 33 and 21 yards to Antonio Brown, followed by Suisham kicking two more field goals to narrow the margin to 27–23. However, Jay Cutler threw a 17-yard touchdown pass to Earl Bennett; the pass was initially ruled as incomplete, but was reversed. Eventually, Lance Briggs stripped Roethlisberger, and Julius Peppers returned the fumble 42 yards for a touchdown. Although the eventual extra point by Gould was blocked by Troy Polamalu, the Bears finished the game with Chris Conte intercepting Roethlisberger with 1:39 left in the game for the fifth takeaway by Chicago on the night and the 40–23 win, dropping the Steelers to 0–3 for the first time since 1986.

Week 4: at Detroit Lions

The second divisional game of the year for the 3–0 Bears, looking for their first 4–0 start in seven seasons, took place at Ford Field against the 2–1 Detroit Lions. Since 2001, the Bears had won 17 of the meetings between the two, compared to Detroit's 9. The Bears defense, ranked 19th in scoring defense with 24.7 points per game and 25th in yards allowed with 383.0, had to keep up with the Lions' 4th-ranked offense, who recorded 410.7 yards per game 27.3 PPG, sixth in the league. The Lions also had running back Reggie Bush return from a knee injury; Bush had recorded 260 yards and a touchdown in the first two games. However, the Lions' leading receiver Nate Burleson broke his arm in a car accident, which meant additional focus on Calvin Johnson for the Bears. Expectations were for Charles Tillman to cover Johnson, who was limited by Tillman to 15 catches, no touchdowns and an average of 62.3 receiving yards in the last three games. Although Tillman had suffered groin and knee injuries that left him questionable for the game, he was later listed as active against the Lions. However, Johnson recorded 40 catches for 20+ yards in 2012, and the Bears allowed the Steelers to gain 20 yards or more in nine plays. To attempt to combat Johnson, the Bears switched from the pressure defense run in the first three games to the cover 2. In the battle on the line of scrimmage, the Bears had to contain Ndamukong Suh and Nick Fairley, while the Lions had to protect Matthew Stafford from Julius Peppers and Corey Wootton. Offensively, the Bears also had to survive the crowd, who helped the Bears commit nine false start penalties in 2011.

Neither team scored a touchdown in the first quarter, instead both scoring field goals, which extended into the first score of the second quarter. Later in the quarter, Matt Forté scored on a 53-yard run, allowing the Bears to take the 10–6 lead. However, after a David Akers field goal, the Lions would score three unanswered touchdowns, all within 3 minutes, 26 seconds: Micheal Spurlock's 57-yard punt return led to Matthew Stafford's 1-yard run, while Jay Cutler was intercepted by Glover Quin, which set up Stafford's 2-yard pass to Calvin Johnson; finally, the Lions scored after Reggie Bush found a hole and hurdled over Bears' safety Major Wright en route to a 37-yard touchdown. The 27 points scored in the quarter was the most by the Lions since September 30, 2007 against the Bears. The Bears ended the half with a field goal, but continued to trail 30–13. After the Bears kicked a field goal in the third quarter, Cutler was intercepted again, this time by Louis Delmas. However, Chicago regained possession after Stafford's pass to Johnson was kicked and caught by Wright. Three plays later, Cutler was sacked by Ndamukong Suh, and fumbled; the ball was picked up by Nick Fairley, who ran four yards for the touchdown. In the fourth quarter, Akers kicked another field goal to put the Lions up 40–16. Afterwards, the Bears began to mount a charge, with Cutler throwing a 14-yard touchdown pass to Alshon Jeffery with less than four minutes in the game, followed by a two-point conversion on another pass to Jeffery. With 43 seconds remaining, a ten-yard pass to Earl Bennett and a two-point conversion off a throw to Brandon Marshall drew the Bears within eight points, but the eventual onside kick was recovered by Lions receiver Kris Durham, allowing the Lions to clinch the 40–32 victory.

Statistically, the Bears offense struggled. Cutler completed 27 of 47 passes for 317 yards, two touchdowns, three interceptions and a 65.6 passer rating. Cutler's three interceptions and fumble tied his turnover amount in the first three games. The offense also had trouble on third down; despite being ranked ninth in third down efficiency, the Bears failed to convert until there were 47 seconds left in the game to end the game converting just 1 of 13 third downs.

Week 5: vs. New Orleans Saints

The Bears entered week six against the undefeated New Orleans Saints, the team Marc Trestman and offensive coordinator Aaron Kromer worked for. The previous meeting between the two teams occurred in 2012, with the Saints winning 30–13. As a result, offensively, the two teams were similar conceptually. For the Bears' offense, a challenge exists in the Saints' 3–4 defense, which ranked sixth in yards allowed at 304.5 per game and fifth in points with 13.8. Additionally, Cameron Jordan and Junior Galette had four and three sacks, respectively, while seven other Saints had a combined total of 12 sacks. Also, Saints tight end Jimmy Graham, the defending NFC Player of the Month, had six touchdowns on the season, and was one touchdown away from tying Mike Ditka and Antonio Gates for the most touchdowns in the first five games by a tight end. Jeff Joniak writes that Soldier Field's Kentucky bluegrass could also serve as an advantage for the Bears, as Drew Brees was 0–4 in Chicago, but those losses occurred in December and January, when the climate was much colder. In the last three meetings in Chicago, the Saints committed a total of nine turnovers (4 in the 2006 NFC Championship game, 3 in 2007, and 2 in 2008), which Joniak considered "may be the only thing slowing down the Saints."

After the Bears punted, Garrett Hartley kicked a 47-yard field goal. On the ensuing possession, Malcolm Jenkins forced Jay Cutler to fumble, and Cameron Jordan recovered the loose ball and reached the Bears' 6-yard line. After failing to score a touchdown, Hartley kicked a 19-yard field goal. In the second quarter, the Saints scored off Drew Brees' two-yard screen pass to Pierre Thomas to increase the lead to 13 points. On Chicago's next drive, the offense traveled 70 yards within eight plays, which ended in Jay Cutler's three-yard touchdown pass to Alshon Jeffery. The final score of the half was by Thomas, who caught a 25-yard pass from Brees. In the third quarter, after Hartley kicked a 36-yard field goal, the Bears traveled 71 yards to the Saints' 5-yard line. However, a penalty on Kyle Long for being an ineligible downfield player, followed by three consecutive incomplete passes forced Robbie Gould to kick a 27-yard field goal. Early in the following quarter, Chicago reached New Orleans' 25-yard line, but turned the ball over on downs after Cutler's pass to Earl Bennett on 4th and 2 was dropped. On the Saints' next drive, a neutral zone infraction penalty by Lance Briggs on 4th and 1 allowed Hartley to kick a 48-yard field goal to extend the Saints' lead to 26–10. However, the Bears attempted to rally, with Cutler throwing three consecutive passes to Jeffery, the final throw going 58 yards to the Saints' 2-yard line, where Brandon Marshall scored. Matt Forté's two-point conversion allowed the Bears to narrow the gap to eight points, but the onside kick was recovered by the Saints. Although the Saints were forced to punt, with 21 seconds remaining, Cutler could only manage to throw a pass to Jeffery which reached the Bears' 41-yard line, as time ran out, giving the Saints the 26–18 win. The win marked the first time the Saints defeated the Bears in an away game since 2002, although that game occurred at Memorial Stadium in Champaign, Illinois.

Jeffery broke the franchise record for most receiving yards in franchise history with 218, which surpassed Harlon Hill's 214 yards against the San Francisco 49ers in 1954. Meanwhile, Marshall was targeted only five times during the game (15 percent of targets on the Bears), the lowest since Marshall's arrival in Chicago; the Bears fell to 0–4 in games when Marshall's target percentage is less than 20 percent.

Week 6: vs. New York Giants

In week six, the Bears and the winless New York Giants met on Thursday night. The Bears and Giants had split the last four meetings since 2004, with Chicago winning the first two in 2004 and 2006, but losing in 2007 and 2010; they had also won the last four games between the teams at Soldier Field. Among the keys to victory for Chicago was to force turnovers, as the Giants led the league in giveaways with 20, while the Bears were ranked second in forced turnovers with 14. Additionally, the Giants had the worst third-down offense, and averaged only 3.3 yards per carry. Chicago also had to attack Eli Manning, who had 12 interceptions entering the game, and was sacked 15 times, the fourth-most in the league; Manning also held a 658 passer rating, one of the lowest in the NFL. However, the Bears' pass defense allowed 278.8 yards per game, which is about 65 yards greater than the previous season's average. The Giants' offense was also returning from a strong game the previous week against the Philadelphia Eagles after scoring three touchdowns and 383 yards.

On the third play from scrimmage, Zack Bowman intercepted Manning's pass intended for Rueben Randle at New York's 36-yard line and reached the 12-yard line, but Jay Cutler threw an incomplete pass to Brandon Marshall on fourth-and-two, giving the ball back to the Giants. On the eventual drive for the Giants, Tim Jennings intercepted Manning and scored the first touchdown of the night on a 48-yard interception return. The Giants eventually scored on Brandon Jacobs' 4-yard run after an 80-yard drive. On the Bears' next possession, Marshall scored on a 10-yard touchdown catch, which New York answered with Randle's 37-yard touchdown reception. Afterwards, Marshall caught a 3-yard pass to increase the score to 21–14, which was extended by Robbie Gould's 40-yard field goal with two seconds remaining in the half. On the first possession of the second half, Gould scored on a 52-yarder, his twelfth-consecutive 50+-yard field goal, tying Viking Blair Walsh's record. New York later engineered a 91-yard drive, which ended in Jacobs scoring on a 1-yard run. Jacobs ended the night with 106 rushing yards, his first 100-yard rushing game since week fourteen of 2011. After getting the ball back, the Giants reached the Bears' 35-yard line, but with 1:35 to go, Manning's pass to Brandon Myers was overthrown, and was tipped off his fingers towards Jennings for Manning's third interception of the night. The Bears ran out the clock to claim the victory, snap their two-game losing streak and gave the Giants their first 0–6 start since 1976.

The Bears recorded a season-high 26 first downs, and didn't allow a sack nor a turnover in a game for the first time since December 23, 2007 against Green Bay.

Week 7: at Washington Redskins

In week seven, the Bears traveled to Landover, Maryland's FedExField to play the 1–4 Washington Redskins. Since 2001, the Redskins had won five of the previous seven meetings, including the last four games. However, the Redskins were 0–2 at home in 2013, and were hoping to avoid going 0–3 at home since 1998. The Bears' third-ranked scoring offense was a potential factor against the Redskins' defense, which allowed 395.0 yards and 28.6 points per game, two of the worst percentages in the league. On offense, Jeff Joniak writes that Chicago had to protect Jay Cutler and the ball, as Washington's 3–4 defense led to 75 quarterback blitzes, eight sacks, two interceptions, and four touchdowns. On the defensive side, the Bears looked to contain Redskins quarterback Robert Griffin III and the read option. Additionally, the Redskins recorded 399.2 yards per game, the fourth best in the NFL. In the special teams phase, the Bears' 23 kick returns were a league-high, which led to an NFL-leading 24.6-yard starting spot. Meanwhile, the Redskins struggled the previous week against the Dallas Cowboys, allowing Dwayne Harris to score on an 86-yard punt return, and allowing him to return a kickoff 90 yards; they ranked last in the league in punt coverage with 19.1 yards allowed per return and 28th in kickoff coverage with 26.4. In the punting game, Adam Podlesh showed improvement in his punting hang time, with five of 26 punts returned, the second-fewest in the NFL. For Washington, punter Sav Rocca had the lowest gross and net averages in punting, and was one of seven punters to have a punt blocked in 2013.

The Redskins struck first with Kai Forbath's 38-yard field goal, which was answered by Robbie Gould's 47-yarder. On Washington's ensuing drive, Griffin was intercepted by Charles Tillman, who returned the pick to the Redskins' 10-yard line, which set up Matt Forté's two-yard touchdown run. In the following quarter, Roy Helu scored on a 14-yard run to tie the game, and Washington pulled ahead after Brian Orakpo intercepted Cutler, scoring on the 29-yard return. Cutler later tore a groin muscle after getting sacked by Chris Baker, and Josh McCown took his role. Afterwards, Devin Hester returned a punt 81 yards for the touchdown, tying Deion Sanders' record for the most return touchdowns all-time with 19. However, the Redskins ended the first half as the leader after Griffin threw a three-yard touchdown pass to Jordan Reed. On the Bears' first drive of the second half, Gould missed a field goal wide right, but Chicago compensated for the miss with Forté's 50-yard touchdown run. Washington ended the third quarter with Helu's three-yard touchdown run to lead 31–24. On Chicago's next drive, the Bears were forced to kick a field goal after blitzes rendered the Bears unable to score a touchdown. Afterwards, the Bears successfully converted an onside kick, but were offsides, and were forced to kick off. Forté scored again on a six-yard run, which Griffin answered with a 45-yard touchdown pass to Aldrick Robinson. The Bears then pulled ahead with McCown's seven-yard touchdown pass to Martellus Bennett. With 3:57 left, the Redskins successfully reached the Bears' three-yard line, where Helu scored again with 45 seconds remaining. On the final play of the game, McCown was sacked by Barry Cofield and Ryan Kerrigan, ending the game with a 45–41 loss.

The game marked the first time in team history that the Bears have allowed 21 points or more in their first seven games, and the first time since 1969 that Chicago has allowed at least 40 points in two consecutive away games. Cutler was projected to be out for the next four weeks, with McCown serving as his replacement.

Statistics-wise, Cutler struggled, completing 3 of 8 passes for 28 yards with one interception and an 8.3 passer rating, while McCown completed 14 of 20 passes for 204 yards with one touchdown and a 119.6 passer rating. On the ground, Forté became the first Bears running back since Rashan Salaam to score three rushing touchdowns in a game. On defense, James Anderson was the only Bear to record a sack.

Week 8: Bye week
The Bears entered their bye week in third in the division behind Green Bay and Detroit. The team was attempting to recover from the injuries suffered by seven players in the previous week against the Redskins. Jay Cutler and Lance Briggs were projected to be out for four weeks, while Brandon Marshall, Alshon Jeffery, Charles Tillman, Major Wright and Blake Costanzo, the other five players hurt, used the bye to heal. Marc Trestman preferred to use the week to rest his players, stating, "I think we did a good thing by letting these guys rest. They came back with a lot of energy [at practice Monday]. There was very little rust in terms of executing and getting through the practice." During Trestman's tenure with the Montreal Alouettes, the Alouettes were 5–4 in games after bye weeks, and 3–1 in the postseason after byes. At practice on October 28, rookie Khaseem Greene filled in for Briggs, and was expected to start against the Packers. Greene and fellow rookie Jon Bostic eventually started for the Bears against the Packers. Lorin Cox of Pro Football Central predicted the Bears would finish the second half of the season with a 4–5 record, and a final record of 8–8.

Week 9: at Green Bay Packers

Coming off their bye week, the Bears traveled to Lambeau Field to play the Green Bay Packers in the 189th meeting between the two rivals. The Bears had struggled regarding scoring against Green Bay in the last nine games between the two prior to 2013, and including the 2010 NFC title game, had scored 127 points, an average of 14.11 points. The two teams entered with among the top three scoring offenses, with Chicago and Green Bay ranked second and third, respectively, with 30.4 and 30.3 points per game, both of which rank behind the Denver Broncos. Among the weapons of the Packers offense that the Bears must attempt to hinder was the running game, as Green Bay's rookie running back Eddie Lacy has recorded over 100 yards per game in the previous six during the season, along with quarterback Aaron Rodgers. One of Rodgers' skills is passing balls longer than 20 yards, and was 16 of 32 on these attempts, which was tied with Russell Wilson of the Seattle Seahawks for the highest percentage in the league; the Bears allowed 57 percent of opponents to throw for the aforementioned distance, the second-worst score in the NFL. However, both teams ranked in the bottom five in the NFL in pass rush, with the Bears being in last with only nine sacks. For Chicago, Matt Forté had gained 533 yards along with averaging 4.6 yards per run, while Josh McCown filled in for Jay Cutler. Since 2009, Bears quarterbacks besides Cutler had thrown a combined eight touchdowns and 21 interceptions against the Packers; in McCown's last start in 2011 against the Packers, he threw for 242 yards, a touchdown and two interceptions in a 35–21 losing effort.

On the Packers' first drive, Rodgers failed to recognize the Bears' zone defense, having expected a man-to-man defense, and Shea McClellin escaped Don Barclay's block and, along with Isaiah Frey, pulled Rodgers down, who landed on his shoulder and injured his left collarbone, and was replaced by Seneca Wallace for the remainder of the game. Afterwards, Mason Crosby kicked the 30-yard field goal to give the Packers the lead. On Chicago's first drive, McCown escaped pressure from Mike Neal and threw towards Brandon Marshall for the 7–3 lead. Once the Packers got the ball back, Wallace's pass for Jordy Nelson was tipped and intercepted by Julius Peppers, and was returned 14 yards to Green Bay's 45-yard line, but after the Bears failed to convert on third down, Adam Podlesh's punt was blocked by Jamari Lattimore. Eventually, James Starks ran 32 yards for the touchdown. However, the Bears traveled 60 yards on two plays, and Forté scored on the 1-yard run. The Bears ended the first half with Robbie Gould's 24-yard field goal to expand the lead to 17–10. In the third quarter, the Packers forced the Bears to punt, and Lacy ran 56 yards to the Bears' 1, and scored on the ensuing play. On the eventual kickoff, the Packers successfully attempted a surprise onside kick, which was recovered by Lattimore. Crosby kicked a 23-yarder on the drive. On the Bears' next drive, McCown threw a six-yard pass to Alshon Jeffery, whose size kept the ball from being knocked away by Davon House. After both teams exchanged punts in the fourth quarter, on the Bears' next drive, began attempting to run out the clock. On 4th and 1 at the Bears' 32 with 7:50 remaining, Forté ran three yards for the conversion and continuing the drive, which ended with Gould's 27-yard field goal. The drive lasted 18 plays and took up 8:58, leaving only 50 seconds remaining in the game. Despite a 15-yard pass by Wallace to Nelson, sacks by Corey Wootton and McClellin ended the game with a 27–20 victory for the Bears.

McCown ended the night completing 22 of 41 passes for 272 yards and two touchdowns, while Wallace completed 11 of 19 for 114 yards and an interception. The win marked the first time the Packers lost at home to an NFC North opponent since 2009, and the first win for the Bears at Lambeau Field since 2007.

Week 10: vs. Detroit Lions

Week ten featured the Bears attempting to avoid suffering the first sweep by the Lions since 2007, while also trying to claim the division lead; the last time the two teams faced each other in a late-season game for the division lead was in 1991, which ended in a Chicago 20–10 win. However, the Bears had won the last five games against the Lions at Soldier Field. On November 7, Marc Trestman announced that Jay Cutler has been cleared by doctors to return against Detroit, despite having been projected to be out for approximately four weeks. Against the Lions, Cutler was 7–2, and won all four home games. On the offensive side, Jeff Joniak states that the Lions defensive line "are ferocious up the middle, they are physical, and they make you pay for poor technique," but that "there is growing confidence that the Bears offense is a resilient one;" the Bears had the fewest pre-snap penalties in the league, and only one false start. The Bears could also seize the Lions' cornerback corps, which struggled during the season, allowing 11 plays of 40 yards or more, along with 4.7 yards per carry. Defensively, Sports Illustrated writers Chris Burke and Doug Farrar wrote the Bears must attempt to hinder Reggie Bush, and improve their performance from the previous week, when the Packers' running game ran for 190 yards and two touchdowns. The Bears also had to prevent Calvin Johnson from excelling; against the Dallas Cowboys, Johnson recorded 329 receiving yards.

Chicago scored first after Cutler's 32-yard touchdown pass to Brandon Marshall capped a 65-yard drive that took just 2:23. However, the Lions would travel 85 yards to tie on Matthew Stafford's 5-yard pass to Kris Durham. In the following quarter, the Bears reached the Lions' 4-yard line, but Cutler's pass was tipped by Ndamukong Suh, and intercepted by DeAndre Levy in the endzone; both teams would fail to score in the quarter. During the quarter, Cutler began showing signs of struggling due to an ankle injury. In the third quarter, the Lions would score on Stafford's four-yard touchdown to Johnson. Afterwards, the Bears were forced to settle for a 25-yard field goal, narrowing the gap to one point. In the fourth, Stafford was intercepted by Chris Conte, who reached Detroit's 9-yard line, and Cutler would then throw a 14-yard touchdown pass to Alshon Jeffery, which was eventually nullified. After an incomplete pass, Gould kicked a 32-yard field goal to draw the score to 14–13. However, Johnson would catch a 14-yard pass from Stafford to increase the lead to 21–13, and with 2:22 remaining, Josh McCown entered the game in favor of Cutler, and guided the Bears' offense 74 yards, culminating in McCown's 11-yard touchdown pass to Marshall with 40 seconds to go. On the two-point conversion, McCown's pass to tight end Dante Rosario fell incomplete, but Willie Young was penalized for roughing the passer, allowing the Bears a second chance, which failed after Matt Forté was tackled by Nick Fairley in the backfield. The Bears' onside kick would backfire, as Joique Bell recovered, sealing a season sweep for the Lions.

Despite stating he was "100 percent" healthy after the groin injury suffered two games prior, it appeared the injury was still lingering; after throwing a pass during the third quarter, Cutler fell down and grabbed his groin, before standing back up.  Regarding the injuries, Cutler stated, "It held up OK. It's all on the same leg so I think that was a problem. But the groin, you take the ankle out of the equation and I would have been fine, I think." Cutler ended the game having completed 21 of 40 passes for 250 yards with a touchdown, interception and a 69.8 passer rating. Despite x-rays on his ankle being negative, Cutler was ruled out of the next week's game against the Baltimore Ravens with a high ankle sprain. During the second quarter, Charles Tillman was also injured, suffering a torn right triceps brachii muscle, and was placed on injured reserve with the designation to return, allowing him to practice after six weeks and play in games two weeks after; as a result, Tillman missed the entire regular season.

Week 11: vs. Baltimore Ravens

Against the Baltimore Ravens in week twelve, the Bears wore their 1940s alternate uniforms. The Bears last played the Ravens in 2009, which ended with a Baltimore 31–7 victory. With Jay Cutler still out, Josh McCown continued to play as quarterback for the Bears, who had the eighth-best passing offense in the league with 261.7 yards per game, which competed against the Ravens' 18th-ranked pass defense. On the ground, the Ravens had the tenth-best rushing D with 102.6 rushing yards allowed per game, but offensively, had the 30th-ranked rushing offense, averaging just 73.1 yards per game, going against Chicago's defense which allowed 129.4 rushing yards per game. Against Joe Flacco, the Bears had the opportunity to force turnovers, as Flacco had thrown eleven interceptions in the previous nine games. For the Bears on offense, a liability was to protect McCown from Terrell Suggs and Elvis Dumervil, who combined for 17 of 32 sacks by the Ravens. Two parties had the majority favoring the Bears for the game: 10 of 13 ESPN analysts predicted a Bears victory, with Ron Jaworski, Seth Wickersham and Cris Carter being the only three to predict a win for Baltimore. CBS Sports analysts predicted the Ravens would win in a 5–4 vote.

The Ravens opened the game with Ray Rice gaining a 47-yard run, his longest of the year up to that point (his previous highest in 2013 was 14 yards), which led to Rice's 1-yard run with 9:58 in the first. The Ravens added to the score with Justin Tucker's 52-yarder, bringing the score to 10–0. With 4:51 left in the first quarter, the game was suspended due to inclement weather, which included a tornado watch, which was eventually elevated to a tornado warning. Fans were ordered to evacuate the stands and enter the covered concourses, while the teams returned to the locker rooms. The evacuation marked the first time Soldier Field had an evacuation since the stadium's opening in 1921. The game resumed play at 3:25 pm. ET, after a 1-hour, 53-minute-delay. In the second quarter, Robbie Gould kicked a 20-yard field goal, and eventually, rookie defensive end David Bass escaped a chop block by Rice and intercepted Flacco, scoring on a 24-yard return and tying the game. The Ravens eventually scored on Torrey Smith's five-yard touchdown catch, and after Flacco had a pass intercepted by Jon Bostic, Gould ended the half kicking a 46-yarder. After a scoreless third period, Matt Forté caught a 14-yard pass from McCown and scored with 10:33 in the fourth, the Bears finally taking the lead 20–17. Now behind by three, the Ravens engineered an 82-yard drive to Chicago's 2-yard line, but Rice failed to score twice, and a botched snap from Gino Gradkowski slowed down the Ravens, and Flacco's pass towards Smith was overthrown. As a result, the Ravens resorted to a 21-yard field goal with three seconds in regulation to force overtime. In overtime, Flacco's pass for Tandon Doss fell incomplete, and the Ravens punted to the Bears. McCown then completed a 43-yard pass to Martellus Bennett, and Gould kicked the game-winning 38-yard field goal with 8:41 remaining to win the game 23–20, which lasted five hours, 16 minutes.

Week 12: at St. Louis Rams

The Bears visited Edward Jones Dome in St. Louis to play the Rams, again without Jay Cutler. However, the Rams were also without starting quarterback Sam Bradford, and instead had Kellen Clemens as backup. The Bears had won four consecutive games against the Rams. Two rookie players the Bears' defense had to contain were running back Zac Stacy, who recorded an average of 107.7 yards and three touchdowns in the previous three games, along with ranking second among rookie running backs with 537 rushing yards; and receiver Tavon Austin, who recorded 314 yards against the Indianapolis Colts in the previous week. Additionally, the Rams' offense was ranked fourth in the NFL with 54.6 percent of yardage occurring after the catch. For the Bears' offense, Jeff Joniak wrote they needed to avoid attempting to score in the red zone; in the previous three games, the Bears had 12 drives in the red zone, but managed to score only four touchdowns, while also allowing a turnover, and was ranked 13th after scoring 55 percent. Meanwhile, the Rams had forced quarterbacks to record only a 45.8 passer rating when in the red zone, along with the second lowest completion percentage, and the third fewest completions recorded. Also, St. Louis led the league in red zone interceptions with six. Finally, the Rams led the league in overall sack percentage with 9.4, while defensive end Robert Quinn had the most knockdowns and hurries in the NFL, and was second in sacks with 12. An advantage Chicago had, however, was the second-most passing touchdowns in the NFL with 15, while Josh McCown's average gain per pass is higher than Cutler's, with a 7.47 to 7.20. The Rams also did not have the capable secondary to cover the trio of Martellus Bennett, Alshon Jeffery and Brandon Marshall.

St. Louis scored first on Austin's 65-yard run, and would reclaim the ball after James Laurinitis stripped Matt Forté, leading to Stacy's one-yard touchdown run. The Bears would then score on McCown's seven-yard touchdown pass to Bennett, but the Rams ended the quarter with a 21–7 lead after Clemens' six-yard touchdown pass to Jared Cook. In the second quarter, McCown threw an incomplete pass, which appeared to be a fumble, and after Rams cornerback Trumaine Johnson picked up the ball, Bears fullback Tony Fiammetta pulled him to the ground by the facemask. Kyle Long would then be involved in an incident with Rams defensive lineman William Hayes, which led to Long kicking Hayes, causing Long's brother Chris Long to restrain Kyle, who would then be penalized for a personal foul. McCown and Fiammetta would also be penalized, for intentional grounding and facemasking, respectively. Halfway through the quarter, Chicago scored after McCown threw a three-yard pass to Marshall, but Greg Zuerlein would score on a 29-yard field goal to give the Rams a 24–14 lead at halftime. The lone score of the third quarter was Zuerlein's 40-yard kick. Early in the fourth quarter, Hester recorded a 62-yard punt return for a touchdown, which was overruled by Craig Steltz's holding penalty. the Bears reached the Rams' one-yard line, but required eight plays: Michael Bush's run went for no gain; McCown's pass to Jeffery was incomplete, but a holding penalty on Brandon McGee gave the Bears a first down; Bush lost two yards on the following run; McCown's touchdown pass to Bennett was nullified by Jermon Bushrod's holding penalty; McCown's 13-yard touchdown pass to Forté was also nullified, after Forté failed to break the plane, instead placing the Bears back on the one-yard line; McCown was then sacked by Michael Brockers, but Brockers was penalized for roughing the passer; Bush failed to gain a yard on the next play; the Bears finally scored on the drive on Bush's one-yard run. On the Rams' ensuing drive, Benny Cunningham gained 27 yards, while the offense gained 48 yards from Clemens' 19 and 29 yards passes to Chris Givens and Cook, respectively. Four plays later, Cunningham scored on a nine-yard run, while Isaiah Pead scored on the two-point conversion. Devin Hester would fumble on the following kickoff, but recovered at the Bears' ten-yard line. After the Bears' offense reached their own 39-yard line, Quinn stripped McCown, and scored on the following fumble return. The game marked the third time the Bears allowed 40 points during the season for the first time since 1964.

McCown set the team record for most completions with 36, two greater than Jim Miller's and Brian Griese's 34 set on November 14, 1999 and September 30, 2007, respectively. Forté recorded 77 yards in the game, adding to 6,178 career rushing yards, surpassing Neal Anderson to become the second-highest rushing leader in team history. The Bears' defense recorded the second-worst defensive output in 2013, with a negative-11.4, making the team's defense the second-worst in the NFL.

Week 13: at Minnesota Vikings

In week thirteen, the Bears visited the Hubert H. Humphrey Metrodome to play the Vikings, whom the Bears trailed 50–53–2 in the all-time series. Josh McCown was given the start for the third straight week, with an expectation that Jay Cutler would return the following week. McCown entered the game having a 65.5 completion percentage for 1,106 yards, seven touchdowns, an interception, and a 100.8 passer rating. As a result, McCown had an advantage over the Vikings' pass defense, which ranked 29th in the league with 282 passing yards allowed, while also allowing quarterbacks to record a 65 completion percentage, 40 attempts per game, and a 97.7 passer rating. Also, the Vikings allowed 31.5 points per game, the worst in the NFL, while recording only 14 turnovers. However, the Bears' defense was a weakness, ranking last in rushing yards allowed per game (145.2), total yards (1,597) and first-downs allowed (89); the defense was 31st in the NFL in yards per carry (4.9), first-down percentage (27.1) and 20-plus yard runs (12). Additionally, the defense allowed running backs in the previous five games to rush for 999 yards, average 5.8 yards per carry, and 197 yards per game. Adrian Peterson ran for an average of 108 yards per game in his career against the Bears, including 120.6 in the last three meetings between the two. Minnesota's rushing game also ran for a year-best 232 yards in the previous week. Cutler, Lance Briggs, Major Wright, Anthony Walters, James Brown, Jonathan Scott, and Cornelius Washington were inactive for the Bears.

In the first quarter, McCown had a pass intercepted by Chad Greenway, but an offsides penalty on Robert Blanton nullified the play; the drive would end with the only score of the first quarter via Robbie Gould's 30-yard field goal. In the second quarter, Cordarrelle Patterson's 33-yard touchdown run gave the Vikings the lead; Gould would subsequently kick a 40-yard field goal. Before the half ended, Christian Ponder suffered from symptoms of a concussion and left. On the Bears' first drive of the second half, McCown threw an 80-yard touchdown pass to Alshon Jeffery. After the Vikings responded with Blair Walsh's 32-yard field goal, Jeffery caught a 46-yard touchdown pass over Viking cornerback Chris Cook to give Chicago the lead 20–10; Cook would eventually be ejected from the game for shoving side judge Laird Hayes. On Minnesota's first possession of the final quarter, Matt Cassel threw an eight-yard touchdown to Greg Jennings, and on Chicago's next drive, McCown's flip pass for Kyle Long was deflected and stripped by Audie Cole, with Marvin Mitchell recovering. Despite starting the drive in the Bears' red zone and reaching the six-yard line, Cassel's pass for Rhett Ellison was tipped and intercepted by Khaseem Greene. After the Bears punted, Cassel fumbled on the first play, but recovered. Afterwards, the Vikings drove from their own six-yard line to the Bears' 12, where Walsh tied the game with a 30-yard field goal, making the score 20–20. On the final play of regulation, Gould's attempted 66-yard field goal fell short. In overtime, the Bears' opening drive ended after McCown was sacked by Jared Allen and fumbled, with Jermon Bushrod recovering, prompting the Bears to punt. On the Vikings' first drive of the period, Walsh's 39-yard field goal was overruled by Ellison's facemasking penalty; Walsh would miss the eventual 57-yarder. The Bears would reach the Vikings' 29-yard line, and on second down, Gould missed the 47-yard kick wide right. The Vikings would reach Chicago's 16-yard line, allowing Walsh to kick the game-winning 34-yard field goal.

Marc Trestman received criticism for calling Gould to attempt the 47-yard field goal on second down, with the Chicago Sun-Times calling the choice "an indefensible case of playing scared." Trestman responded by stating he did not want to lose a fumble or suffer a penalty. Jeffery set the team record for the most receiving yards in one game with 249, surpassing his previous record set against the Saints in week 5.

Week 14: vs. Dallas Cowboys

The Bears announced on May 24, 2013, that they would retire former tight end and head coach Mike Ditka's number 89 jersey at the Bears-Cowboys halftime ceremony. The number was the last to be retired by the organization, with team chairman George McCaskey stating, "If there is going to be a last one, there is no more appropriate one than 89." During the ceremony, players from the 1985 Bears congratulated Ditka through messages on the videoboard. Ditka concluded his speech by saying, "Thank you, thank you, thank you. Go Bears!"

The two teams had split their meetings 2–2 since 2004, Dallas winning in 2004 and 2007, and Chicago winning in 2010 and 2012. Among the players the Bears had to contain is Cowboys running back DeMarco Murray, who averaged 5 yards per carry. The Bears had the worst-ranked rushing defense in the league with 153.6 yards allowed per game, but the Cowboys ranked last in rushing attempts with 249. ESPN Chicago's Michael C. Wright writes that the Bears could use its sixth-ranked passing offense to attack the Cowboys' 31st-ranked passing defense, which has allowed 294.9 yards per game. The Cowboys' defense also allowed a league-worst 422 yards per game.

Dallas opened the game with a 12-play, 75-yard drive ending with Tony Romo's 2-yard touchdown pass to Dez Bryant. The Bears scored the final touchdown of the first quarter on Josh McCown's 4-yard pass to Earl Bennett, the result of a 78-yard drive. With 8:58 left in the first half, McCown scored on a 7-yard run to take the lead 14–7, which the Cowboys answered with Romo's 10-yard pass to Jason Witten. After Robbie Gould kicked a 27-yard field goal, the Bears scored again after McCown threw a 25-yard touchdown pass to Alshon Jeffery, who caught the ball over B. W. Webb in the back of the endzone with 0:17 left in the half. On the first drive of the third quarter, Gould kicked a 34-yard field goal, which was bolstered by Matt Forté's 5-yard touchdown catch and Brandon Marshall scoring on a 2-point conversion to increase the score to 35–14. In the fourth quarter, Michael Bush scored on a 17-yard touchdown reception, and the Cowboys responded with a 9-yard touchdown catch by Cole Beasley. Gould eventually kicked a 23-yarder, while the Cowboys scored Joseph Randle's 1-yard run with six seconds to go. On the ensuing onside kick, the ball was recovered by Marshall, and McCown ran the clock out to seal the 45–28 win.

Week 15: at Cleveland Browns

Jay Cutler made his return to action against the 4–9 Cleveland Browns, a move that was criticized by fans. In November, a poll conducted by the Chicago Sun-Times revealed that fans favored Josh McCown with 66.87 percent, with Cutler earning 29.31 percent. On December 9, ESPN analyst Skip Bayless tweeted, "As much as I've supported Vanderbilt's own Jay Cutler, I must admit Josh McCown runs this offense like he owns it." Bleacher Report's Dilan Ames stated that although Cutler is the better quarterback, his injury tendencies and inability to play a full season since 2009 had affected him, along with the statistics comparison between the two quarterbacks: Cutler has recorded 1,908 yards, 13 touchdowns and eight interceptions, while McCown has thrown for 1,809 yards, 13 touchdowns and one interception. However, Brandon Marshall defended Cutler's status as the starter, stating:

McCown also acknowledged his backup position on the team, and told the Chicago Tribune, "The way that I serve my team is to play when the starter is not healthy. Jay is our starting quarterback, there is no doubt about that."

Seven CBS Sports analysts predicted a Bears victory, with Pete Prisco being the only one to favor the Browns. Jeff Joniak stated that the Bears had to attack the Browns' 3–4 defense, who ranked third in yards per pass attempt allowed at 5.32, with their fifth-ranked passing offense. Chicago's wide receiver duo of Marshall and Alshon Jeffery should also be utilized, as Joe Haden and Buster Skrine are at a size mismatch (Marshall is 5 inches and 40 pounds larger than Haden, while Jeffery is 6 inches and 30 pounds heavier than Skrine). Browns offensive coordinator Ray Horton commented, "This team, Chicago, is a lot like Detroit in that they have weapons at every position. Brandon Marshall and Alshon Jeffery have the most catches in the league. They have the most combined yards in the league. They are both, in our mind, No. 1 receivers. They present a challenge that you can't double everybody. You can't roll up to one guy because the other guy's open." On defense, the Bears had to contain Josh Gordon and Jordan Cameron. Gordon ranks second in yards after catch, while leading all receivers with 71 for an average of 19.7 yards. Cameron leads all tight ends with 23 third down catches. The Bears' worst-ranked run defense also has to defend against the Browns, which had the third-fewest rushing attempts in the league with 290 with an average of 3.78 yards, which is one of the bottom six in the league.

The Bears' opening drive ended at Cleveland's 14-yard line when Cutler had his pass tipped in the endzone by T. J. Ward and intercepted by Tashaun Gipson. The Browns then scored on Billy Cundiff's 35-yard field goal, which was tied by Robbie Gould kicking a 23-yarder. Eventually, the Bears reached the Browns' 24-yard line on another drive, and after a penalty on Alshon Jeffery forced the Bears to kick a 46-yard field goal, the score was nullified by Corey Wootton's holding penalty, forcing Chicago to punt. With 8:01 in the first half, Cutler was again intercepted by Gipson, who returned the pick 44 yards for a touchdown and the 10–3 lead. With 24 seconds remaining in the half, Cutler connected on a 5-yard touchdown pass with Marshall to close the half at 10–10. Cutler ended the first half with 13 of 19 passes completed for 168 yards, a touchdown and two interceptions. Early in the third quarter, Jason Campbell's pass for Greg Little was intercepted by Zack Bowman and returned 43 yards for the score. Cleveland's Edwin Baker eventually scored his first career NFL touchdown on a 2-yard run, and the Browns added to the score when Billy Winn punched the ball from Martellus Bennett, and Ward returned the fumble 52 yards for the 24–17 advantage. Eventually, Cutler guided the Bears from their own 5-yard line, culminating in a 45-yard touchdown pass to Jeffery after Gipson made an ill-timed leap and Julian Posey being unable to interrupt the play with 10:59 remaining. With 5:41 left in the game, Cutler threw a 5-yard pass to Earl Bennett to take the 31–24 lead, which was extended by Michael Bush on a 40-yard touchdown run. Cutler's touchdown pass to Bennett was the twenty-ninth passing touchdown of the season, which ties the team record set in 1947 and 1995. With 1:03 to go, Campbell threw a 43-yard touchdown pass to Josh Gordon, but the Bears recovered the ensuing onside kick to seal the victory, 38–31. The win marked the third time since 1970 that the Bears won all four games against an AFC division, and the first since 1986.

The following night, the Bears would jump to first place of the NFC North after the Lions were defeated by the Ravens. The Bears had the opportunity to clinch the division in week sixteen by defeating the Philadelphia Eagles, in addition to losses by the Packers and Lions.

Week 16: at Philadelphia Eagles

Chicago entered week sixteen with a chance to clinch the NFC North in the event that the Packers and Lions lost. The Packers and Lions eventually lost to the Steelers and Giants, respectively, putting the Bears in position to win the division by defeating the Eagles. The last game between the Bears and Eagles was in 2011, when the Bears won 30–24; the Bears also lead the all-time series 30–12–1, though the Eagles had won six of the last ten meetings. However, the Bears had won four of five meetings between the two teams in the last six years, but all by less than six points. One of the Bears' keys to victory is to prevent LeSean McCoy from dominating; the Bears had the worst run defense in the league, while McCoy leads the league in rushing. Chicago's defense also must contain the Eagles' fast-scoring offense: the Eagles had the lowest average time of possession per drive at 2:24, while the league average is 3:27. Philadelphia also is the only team in the league to score in fewer than seven plays per drive. In the passing game, Chicago had the fourth-best passing offense, while the Eagles were 26th in pass defense. However, the Eagles are ranked sixth in rushing defense.

The Bears fell behind early in the first quarter when Nick Foles threw a 5-yard touchdown pass to Riley Cooper with 9:54 to go, followed by Devin Hester getting the ball stripped on the ensuing kickoff and Cary Williams recovering the loose ball. LeSean McCoy eventually scored on a 1-yard run with 7:44 in the first, and Philadelphia added to the scoring with Foles throwing a 10-yard touchdown pass to Brent Celek. After Alex Henery kicked a 49-yard field goal, the Bears scored their first points of the game with Robbie Gould's 50-yard field goal on the last play of the first half. In the second half, the Eagles scored off a safety after Cedric Thornton tackled Matt Forté. Philadelphia scored again after McCoy recorded another rushing touchdown. The Bears scored their first touchdown after Jay Cutler threw a 6-yard pass to Brandon Marshall, followed by a two-point conversion off Cutler's pass to Earl Bennett. With 11:19 remaining, Chris Polk scored on a 10-yard run to increase the score to 40–11, added by Brandon Boykin intercepting Cutler and scoring on a 54-yard return. Afterwards, Josh McCown filled in for Cutler. The Eagles scored again after Bryce Brown ran 65 yards for the touchdown to make the final score 54–11, the biggest blowout since a 47–0 loss to the Houston Oilers in 1977 and the second-most points allowed in team history, behind a 55–20 loss to Detroit in 1997.

The Bears failed to score 18 points for the first time in 2013, while allowing a season-high five sacks. Chicago also allowed two 100-yard rushers in the same game for the first time since 1976 against the Denver Broncos, with Norris Weese (120 yards) and Otis Armstrong (116 yards) guiding the Broncos to 28–14 win. After the game, Marc Trestman stated, "We are a team that was ready to play this game and we played a terrible football game for lack of a better word. I'm not going to use any word other than that. We were terrible in all three phases. We didn't play well in any phase of football."

Week 17: vs. Green Bay Packers

In the season-ender against the Packers for the NFC North title, Aaron Rodgers made his return to action for the first time since week 9 against the Bears, who intend to sweep the Packers for the first time since 2007. The Packers had fallen to 2–5–1 without Rodgers, and entered the game with a 7–7–1 record. However, Green Bay did not have Clay Matthews in the lineup, which ESPN wrote could provide an advantage for Jay Cutler, who had a 1–8 record against the Packers. The Packers had won seven of the last nine games between the rivals, while winning 21–13 in 2012's game at Soldier Field; Green Bay had won the last three games at Soldier Field. Rodgers' absence had improved the Packers' rushing offense, which ranked seventh with 131.7 yards per game, which played against the Bears' worst-ranked rush defense, having allowed 161.5 rushing yards per game, 25.6 yards greater than the 31st-ranked team. Also, the Bears had allowed 5.4 rushing yards per carry, the worst in the league since the 1961 Vikings. For the Bears' offense, the team had to utilize Matt Forté against a Packers defense that allowed 4.61 yards per run. Quarterbacks against the Packers had a 95.5 passer rating, recording 7.70 yards per pass, and a 1.9 interception percentage. However, the offensive line had to protect Cutler against the pass rush, with Green Bay ranked eighth in the NFL with 43 sacks, with 25 of them from blitzes. The game marked the first time since the NFL realigned with eight divisions in  that the NFC North did not feature a division champion with at least ten wins. The Packers were the favorite by −3.

After the Bears punted on the opening drive, the Packers reached Chicago's five-yard line, but Rodgers was intercepted by Chris Conte. Chicago scored on the following possession with Forté's four-yard run. In the second quarter, Rodgers was intercepted by Tim Jennings. After the Packers scored on Mason Crosby's 33-yard field goal, Devin Hester fumbled on the kickoff, but recovered; the Bears would be forced to punt. After Green Bay reached Chicago's 17-yard line, Rodgers was hit by Julius Peppers, with the ball leaving his hand as his arm went forward; the players did not attempt to recover the ball, as if it was an incompletion, but the referees did not consider the play dead. Jarrett Boykin subsequently picked up the ball, and scored on the play. On the Bears' next drive, Cutler's pass to Alshon Jeffery was stripped by Tramon Williams, and was recovered by Morgan Burnett. Crosby scored the final score of the first half with a 27-yard field goal. In the third quarter, the Bears regained the lead with Forté's five-yard touchdown run. Both teams exchanged scores on the next two drives of the game, with the Packers scoring on Rodgers' seven-yard touchdown throw to Randall Cobb, followed by Forté's one-yard touchdown run, ending the quarter with the Bears leading 21–20. On the first play of the final quarter, Cutler threw a five-yard touchdown pass to Brandon Marshall, which the Packers retaliated with Eddie Lacy's six-yard touchdown run. After the Bears punted, the Packers reached the Bears' 48-yard line with 48 seconds left. Defensive coordinator Mel Tucker called a blitz, but Conte failed to apply man-to-man coverage, allowing Cobb to score the game-winning touchdown. However, the Packers failed the two-point conversion, making the score 33–28. The Bears received the ball with 38 seconds left, and reached the Packers' 45-yard line, where Cutler's Hail Mary pass for  Marshall was intercepted by Sam Shields as time expired.

The season marked the sixth time in the previous seven years the Bears missed the playoffs. Despite forcing two turnovers, the Bears defense allowed the Packers to record 473 yards, convert 9 of 18 third down plays, a 35:09 time of possession and run 76 plays in comparison to Chicago's 49.

Standings

Division

Conference

Statistics
Statistically, the Bears offense greatly improved from its 2012 counterpart. The 2013 offense ended the year with the second-best scoring offense with 445 points, behind the Denver Broncos; the previous year ranked 16th at 375 total points and 23.4 PPG. The 2012 team also was ranked 29th in passing yards with 2999, while the following year improved to fifth with 4281 yards. The offense also broke team records in total yards (6,109), passing yards (4,450), passing touchdowns (32), first downs (344) and passer rating (96.9), while falling short of the 1985 team's record of points scored in a season by 11, ending with 445. However, the defense struggled mightily throughout the season, ranking 30th in the NFL, with injuries ending the seasons of five players: defensive tackles Henry Melton and Nick Collins, cornerbacks Kelvin Hayden and Charles Tillman, and linebacker D. J. Williams. After having the fifth-ranked defense in the league in 2012, the team allowed franchise-records in yards allowed with 6,313, rushing yards allowed (2,583) and points with 478 in 2013 (also ranking 29th in the NFL in points allowed per game with 29.9), while allowing a league-worst 5.35 rushing yards per carry; the Bears were the only team in the NFL to allow five yards per carry during the year. In third-down stops, the Bears ranked 25th. Additionally, the defense tied the Jacksonville Jaguars for the fewest sacks in the league with 31. Regarding the defense, Chicago Tribune writer Steve Rosenbloom wrote, "Under Angelo and Smith, the Bears couldn't win enough games where they needed only three offensive touchdowns. Under Emery and Trestman, the Bears couldn't win enough games where they needed to hold opponents to only three offensive touchdowns."

Position reviews
Together, quarterbacks Jay Cutler and Josh McCown broke team records in touchdown passes, passing yards, completion percentage and passer rating with 32, 4,450, 64.4 and 96.9, respectively. Individually, in eleven games, Cutler completed 63.1 percent of his passes for 2,621 yards with 19 touchdowns, 12 interceptions and a career-high 89.2 passer rating. In the other five games, McCown completed 66.8 percent of passes for 1,829 yards, 13 touchdowns, an interception and a 109 passer rating, which ranked third in the NFL behind Denver's Peyton Manning and Philadelphia's Nick Foles. Running back Matt Forte had 1,339 rushing yards, a career-high, while wide receivers Brandon Marshall and Alshon Jeffery had 1,200 receiving yards each, as the Bears became the first team to accomplish the feat since the 2002 Buffalo Bills. Marshall was also ranked the best receiver by Pro Football Focus with a score of 37.8, 13.1 higher than Green Bay's Jordy Nelson. The offensive line was also drastically changed from its 2012 counterpart, allowing the fourth-lowest sacks in the league with 30, compared to allowing the eighth-most in 2012 with 44.

On special teams, Robbie Gould tied his team record for the highest field goal percentage with 89.7 by converting 26 of 29 field goals. Gould also became the second player in franchise history to reach 1,000 career points during the season. However, punter Adam Podlesh ranked 33rd in the league in gross average punting yards with 40.6. In comparison with his 2012 stats, Podlesh was 18th in the league in net punting average with 39.4 yards, 34 punts landing inside the 20-yard line with 6 touchbacks. In 2013, he dropped to 29th in the former category with 37.9 yards, 27 punts inside the 20 and four fewer touchbacks. The punting corps also ranked last in the league in gross punting with 40 yards. In the return game, Devin Hester led the league in kickoff return yards with 1,442 and was fifth in kickoff return average with 27.7 yards. Linebacker Blake Costanzo led all Bears gunners with 17 tackles. Cornerback Sherrick McManis ranked second with 15, followed by safety Craig Steltz (14), receiver Eric Weems (13) and safety Anthony Walters (10). Ultimately, the Bears' special teams ranked 23rd in the NFL, leading the league in kickoff coverage after allowing 18.7 yards per return.

Awards and records

Awards
On December 27, Brandon Marshall and Matt Forte were named to the 2014 Pro Bowl, the fewest Bears sent since 2009, when two were also sent, and the first time a Bears defensive player was not invited since 2004. On January 14, 2014, Marshall and Forte were named to the Pro Football Writers Association's All-NFC Team. On January 3, 2014, the Associated Press released its annual All-Pro team, with no Bears named. On January 9, 2014, Alshon Jeffery was named to the Pro Bowl after an injury to Calvin Johnson. Jeffery was later named the PFWA's Most Improved Player on January 17. On January 20, Tim Jennings and Kyle Long were named to the Pro Bowl, replacing Richard Sherman of the Seattle Seahawks, who advanced to Super Bowl XLVIII and Mike Iupati suffered an injury, respectively. Long's invitation marked the first time a Bears rookie was invited since special teamer Johnny Knox in 2009, and the first offensive rookie since Gale Sayers in 1965. The four offensive Pro Bowlers are the most sent by the Bears since 1985, when Jim McMahon, Walter Payton, Jay Hilgenberg and Jim Covert were invited to the game. Forte, Marshall and Jeffery's invitations also marked the first time since 1985 the Bears sent multiple skill position players, and the most sent by the team since 1963 with Bill Wade, Joe Marconi and Mike Ditka. Forte, Marshall and Jeffery were eventually drafted in the fantasy draft by Team Rice, while Long and Jennings were assigned to Team Sanders. In the 22–21 victory for Team Rice, Forte ran for 31 yards on six attempts while catching three passes for 24 yards. Jeffery and Marshall recorded two and one catch for 22 and 21 yards, respectively. For Team Sanders, Jennings recorded three tackles, while Long assisted in shoving Cam Newton into the endzone.

On January 8, 2014, Long was named to the Pro Football Focus All-Rookie Team. On January 15, Gil Brandt named Long to the NFL.com All-Rookie Team. On January 24, Josh McCown and Matt Slauson were named to the USA Today All-Joe Team, which honors players who have never been invited to a Pro Bowl. Prior to the 3rd Annual NFL Honors, Matt Forte was nominated for FedEx Ground Player of the Year against Philadelphia's LeSean McCoy and Kansas City's Jamaal Charles, but lost to McCoy. During the show, Charles Tillman was awarded the Walter Payton NFL Man of the Year Award for his charitable work in the Chicago area.

Weekly awards
 In week two against the Vikings, Devin Hester was named NFC Special Teams Player of the Week on September 18.
 In week nine against the Packers, Shea McClellin recorded three sacks, and was named NFC Defensive Player of the Week on November 6.
 After scoring five touchdowns in week fourteen against the Cowboys, the most by a Bears quarterback since Jack Concannon in 1972, Josh McCown was named the NFC Offensive Player of the Week on December 11.

Records

Team

Season
 The Bears offense broke four team records in 2013: the most total yards with 6,109, the most passing yards with 4,450, the most passing touchdowns with 32, and the most first downs with 344.
 The defense set three franchise records during the season, which included allowing the most yards in team history with 6,313, along with the most rushing yards allowed with 2,583, and the most points allowed with 478.

Individual

Game
 In week one against the Bengals, Robbie Gould kicked and made the longest field goal attempt in franchise and Soldier Field history with a 58-yard attempt made in week one against the Bengals.
 In week two, Devin Hester set a franchise record for the most kick return yards in a game with 249 kickoff return yards against the Vikings. The previous record of 225 yards was also held by Hester.
 In week thirteen against Minnesota, Alshon Jeffery broke the franchise record for the most receiving yards in a game.

Staff

Final roster

Footnotes

References

External links
 
 Chicago Bears Report at ESPN Chicago
 Chicago Bears Team Page on NFL.com
 2013 Chicago Bears at Pro Football Reference

Chicago
Chicago Bears seasons
Bear
2010s in Chicago
2013 in Illinois